Bagmati Province cricket team, also known as Team Bagmati is a Nepali provincial cricket team, based in the Bagmati Province of Nepal. The team plays limited overs and Twenty20 cricket in the Prime Minister One Day Cup and the Gautam Buddha Cup. The team is currently being run under the Cricket Association of Bagmati Province, with Gyanendra Malla as the team captain.

History 
The team was formed and named as Team Bagmati in December 2020, ahead of the 2020 Gautam Buddha Cup, which was played by three teams from 12 December to 15 December 2020. The team competed in the tournament under the leadership of Nepalese national captain Gyanendra Malla.

Seasons summary

2020 Gautam Buddha Cup 

Team Bagmati made its entrance to Nepalese domestic cricket for the first time, on 12 December 2020, against the Team Narayani, which ended in a tie. However, later Team Narayani was announced as the winner, when Team Bagmati fell short of 5 runs while chasing the target of 26 in the super over. Team Bagmati lost their next match by 11 runs to end their campaign disappointingly, as they were eliminated from the tournament.

2021 Prime Minister Cup 

Bagmati Province was one of the ten teams participating in the 2021 Prime Minister Cup, a limited overs tournament, which commenced on 15 January and ended on 13 January 2021. Bagmati started their campaign for PM Cup pleasingly as the won their inaugural match by 7 wickets against the Nepal Police Club, guided by Tilak Bhandari's four wickets for seventeen runs. In their next match, Prithu Baskota's 84 runs off 99 balls starred in Bagmati's 180-runs massive victory, as Sudurpaschim Province were all out for 119. After their next match being tied, Bagmati Province ensured their place in the semi-finals, although they lost the sem-final match against Tribhuwan Army Club and were eliminated from the tournament.

Current squad

Seasons overview

Gautam Buddha Cup

Prime Minister One Day Cup

References

External links 

 Bagmati Province at ESPNcricinfo

Cricket clubs established in 2020
Cricket in Nepal
Cricket teams in Nepal
2020 establishments in Nepal